Grahamville is an unincorporated community in Jasper County, in the U.S. state of South Carolina.

History
Grahamville had its start as the summer residence of a local landowner. A post office called Grahamville was established in 1830, and remained in operation until 1908.

References

Unincorporated communities in Jasper County, South Carolina
Unincorporated communities in South Carolina